Tambora is a lost village and culture on Sumbawa Island buried by volcanic ash and pyroclastic flows from the massive 1815 eruption of Mount Tambora. The village had about 10,000 residents. Scientists unearthing the site have discovered ceramic pots, bronze bowls, glass bottles, and homes and villagers buried by ash in a manner similar to that of Pompeii. The language of the culture was wiped out. The language appears to have been an isolate, the last survivor of the pre-Austronesian languages of central Indonesia. The village was visited by western explorers shortly before its demise. It is believed to have traded with Indochina, as Tambora pottery resembles that found in Vietnam.

2004 work
In summer 2004, a team from the University of Rhode Island, the University of North Carolina at Wilmington, and the Indonesian Directorate of Volcanology, led by Haraldur Sigurðsson, began an archaeological dig in Tambora. Over six weeks, the team unearthed the first evidence of a lost culture that had been obliterated by the Tambora eruption. The site is located about 25 km (15.5 mi) west of the caldera, deep in the jungle, 5 km (3 mi) from the shore. The team had to cut through a deposit of volcanic pumice and ash 3 m (10 ft) thick.

The team used a ground-penetrating radar to locate a small buried house. They excavated the house, where they found the remains of two adults, as well as bronze bowls, ceramic pots, iron tools and other artifacts. The design and decoration of the artifacts have similarities with artifacts from Vietnam and Cambodia. Tests conducted using a carbonization technique revealed they were composed of charcoal formed by the heat of the magma. The people and the house are preserved as they were in 1815. Sigurðsson dubbed it the Pompeii of the East. Based on the artifacts found, which were mainly bronze objects, the team concluded that the people were not poor. Historical evidence indicates that people on Sumbawa island were known in the East Indies for their honey, horses, sappan wood for producing red dye, and sandalwood used for incense and medications. The area was thought to be highly productive agriculturally.

The archaeological findings suggest that there was a culture on Sumbawa that was wiped out by the 1815 eruption. The title Lost Kingdom of Tambora was coined by media. With this discovery, Sigurðsson had planned to return to Tambora in 2007 to search for the rest of the villages, and hopefully to find a palace.

See also
1815 eruption of Mount Tambora
Tambora language

References

External links
Guardian article
New York Times article

Precolonial states of Indonesia
Archaeological cultures of Southeast Asia
Sumbawa
Archaeology of Indonesia